In the mathematics of social science, and especially game theory, a moving-knife procedure is a type of solution to the fair division problem. The canonical example is the division of a cake using a knife.

The simplest example is a moving-knife equivalent of the I cut, you choose scheme, first described by A.K.Austin as a prelude to his own procedure:  
 One player moves the knife across the cake, conventionally from left to right.  
 The cake is cut when either player calls "stop".  
 If each player calls stop when he or she perceives the knife to be at the 50-50 point, then the first player to call stop will produce an envy-free division if the caller gets the left piece and the other player gets the right piece. 
(This procedure is not necessarily efficient.)

Generalizing this scheme to more than two players cannot be done by a discrete procedure without sacrificing envy-freeness.

Examples of moving-knife procedures include

 The Stromquist moving-knives procedure
 The Austin moving-knife procedures
 The Levmore–Cook moving-knives procedure
 The Robertson–Webb rotating-knife procedure
 The Dubins–Spanier moving-knife procedure
 The Webb moving-knife procedure

References

Cake-cutting